Ralph Jarron Cordiner (March 20, 1900 - December 5, 1973) was an American businessman. He served as president of General Electric from 1950 to 1958, and as its chairman and chief executive officer from 1958 to 1963.

Biography
He was born in 1900 on a 1280-acre wheat farm in Walla Walla, Washington. He attended Whitman College, working odd jobs and selling washing machines, and graduated in 1922 with a Bachelor of Science in Economics.

He joined the Edison General Electric Appliance Company, a GE affiliate, in 1923. Later, he became manager of its Northwest and Ocean Pacific divisions. From 1932 to 1938, he worked in its Bridgeport, Connecticut office. In 1939, he left GE and served as president of Schick until 1942. He returned to GE and worked as Charles E. Wilson's assistant. In 1950, he became president of GE, up until 1958. From 1958 to 1963, he served as chairman and CEO. During his tenure, he decentralized GE into 120 units.

He served as chairman of the Defense Advisory Committee on Professional and Technical Compensation in the Armed Forces. He also served as chairman of The Business Council from 1960 to 1961.

He was on the cover of Time Magazine on January 12, 1959.  He was the recipient of the first Gold Medal Award of the Economic Club of New York.

References

People from Walla Walla, Washington
Whitman College alumni
American businesspeople
General Electric people
1900 births
Year of death missing
Henry Laurence Gantt Medal recipients
General Electric chief executive officers